The Mt. Prospect Open was a golf tournament on the LPGA Tour, played only in 1959. It was played at the Mount Prospect Country Club in Mount Prospect, Illinois. Betsy Rawls won the event.

References

Former LPGA Tour events
Golf in Illinois
Mount Prospect, Illinois
1959 in Illinois
History of women in Illinois